The 1995 World Netball Championships was the ninth edition of the INF Netball World Cup, a quadrennial premier event in international netball. It was held in Birmingham, England and featured a record 27 teams.  South Africa returned to competition after the abolition of apartheid. 

Australia claimed their seventh title.

First round

Group A

Group B

Group C

Group D

Group E

Group F

Group G

Consolation round

Group W

Group X

Second round

Group Y

Group Z

Placement matches

Final

Final placings

Medallists

References

1995
International netball competitions hosted by England
1995 in netball
Netball
International sports competitions in Birmingham, West Midlands
1990s in Birmingham, West Midlands
July 1995 sports events in the United Kingdom